Denis George Browne  (born 21 September 1937) is the Emeritus Bishop of Hamilton, New Zealand. He was Ordinary of the Catholic Diocese of Hamilton from 1994 to 2014. Previously, he was Bishop of Cook Islands and Niue (1977–1983) and then became the tenth Catholic Bishop of Auckland (1983–1994).

Biography
Browne was born in Auckland on 21 September 1937, the son of Neville John and Catherine Anne Browne. Browne received his primary education at St. Michael's Primary school, Remuera, and his secondary education at St. Peter's College, Epsom, conducted by the Christian Brothers. He then went on to study at Holy Name Seminary, Christchurch (operated by the Jesuit order) and Holy Cross College, Mosgiel (operated by the Vincentian order).

Denis Browne was ordained a Catholic priest on 30 June 1962 by James Liston, Archbishop of Auckland, at St Patrick's Cathedral, Auckland. After ordination, he was assigned to parish work in Gisborne where he served from 1963 until 1968. He was at Papatoetoe 1968–1971 and at Remuera 1972– 1975. He served in Tonga (Nukualofa, Houma,`Eva) in the period 1975–1977.  On  29 June 1977 he was consecrated a bishop in St. Patrick's Cathedral, Auckland. He served as Bishop of the Cook Islands and Niue until 1983. He became the tenth Bishop of Auckland on 24 August 1983 and served in that post until 1994 when he was translated to Hamilton as its second bishop. He was president of the New Zealand Catholic Bishops Conference and a member of the executive committee of the Federation of Catholic Bishops Conferences of Oceania.

In 1990, Browne was awarded the New Zealand 1990 Commemoration Medal. In the 2001 Queen's Birthday Honours, he was appointed a Companion of the New Zealand Order of Merit, for services to the community.

Brown's resignation from the see was accepted by Pope Francis on 22 November 2014 and his successor Stephen Lowe was appointed as the 3rd Bishop of Hamilton on the same date. Browne was the principal consecrator at Stephen Lowe's episcopal consecration in the Hamilton Cathedral of the Blessed Virgin Mary on 13 February 2015.

References

External links
 Bishop Denis George Browne, Catholic Hierarchy website (retrieved 12 February 2011)
 Hamilton Catholic Diocese
 Dennis Browne, NZ Catholic Church website

1937 births
Living people
New Zealand expatriates
20th-century Roman Catholic bishops in New Zealand
Companions of the New Zealand Order of Merit
People educated at St Peter's College, Auckland
Holy Name Seminary alumni
Holy Cross College, New Zealand alumni
Roman Catholic bishops of Hamilton, New Zealand
21st-century Roman Catholic bishops in New Zealand
Roman Catholic bishops in the Cook Islands
Roman Catholic bishops of Rarotonga